Denio Canton (July 19, 1919 – March 22, 2005) was a Cuban pitcher in the Negro leagues in the 1940s.

A native of Havana, Cuba, Canton played for the New York Cubans in 1941. He died in Miami, Florida in 2005 at age 85.

References

External links
 and Seamheads

1919 births
2005 deaths
New York Cubans players
Cuban expatriate baseball players in the United States
Baseball players from Havana
Baseball pitchers